Volvi may refer to:

 The edible bulbs of the grape hyacinth
 Lake Volvi in Greece
 Volvi (municipality) in Greece
 "Volví", a 2021 song by Aventura and Bad Bunny